Frederick Ernest Tayler (18 July 1889 – 30 April 1954) was an English cricketer who played for Warwickshire in 1910 and Gloucestershire in 1911 as a right-handed batsman. He was born at Cold Aston, Gloucestershire (sometimes called Aston Blank) and died there as well.

References

1889 births
1954 deaths
English cricketers
English cricketers of 1890 to 1918
Gloucestershire cricketers
Warwickshire cricketers